Runarsko is a small village east of Nova Vas in the Municipality of Bloke in the Inner Carniola region of Slovenia.

Name
Runarsko was attested in historical sources as Wurnarisk and Runarisk in 1436, and as Runersko in 1505, among other spellings.

Church
The local church in the settlement is dedicated to the Nativity of Mary and belongs to the Parish of Bloke.

References

External links
Runarsko on Geopedia

Populated places in the Municipality of Bloke